Claus-Wilhelm Canaris (1 July 1937 – 5 March 2021) was a German jurist. Until his retirement in 2005 he was professor of Private Law, Commercial law and Labour law the University of Munich.

Life 
Canaris was born in Liegnitz, Germany. His father was Constantin Canaris. Canaris went to school in Königsberg, Miesbach and Düsseldorf. He studied law, philosophy and Germanistics in Paris, Geneva and Munich, where he passed the first state exam (erstes Staatsexamen) in 1961. He became scientific assistant (wissenschaftlicher Assistent) of Karl Larenz at the University of Munich and graduated with the dissertation Die Feststellung von Lücken im Gesetz (How to find lacunas in the law) in 1964 (2nd edition 1983). He habilitated in Munich in 1967 (Die Rechtsscheinhaftung im deutschen Privatrecht). His habilitation thesis was a groundbreaking study on the theory of legitimate expectations equal in rank to Rudolf von Jherings operationalization of culpa in contrahendo.

He was appointed full professor at the University of Graz in 1968, at the University of Hamburg in 1969 and finally returned to Munich in 1972 taking the chair of his academic teacher Karl Larenz. In 2000 the German Minister of Justice, Herta Däubler-Gmelin, made him a member of the committee for the reform of the German law of obligations (Schuldrechtsreform). He was professor emeritus from 2004 to his death.

Memberships and honours 
1989: Gottfried Wilhelm Leibniz Prize of the Deutsche Forschungsgemeinschaft
1990: Member of the  philosophical-historical class of the Bavarian Academy of Sciences
1990: Doctor honoris causa der University of Lisbon
1991: Member of the European Academy of Sciences and Arts, Salzburg
1993: Doctor honoris causa of the Autonomous University of Madrid
1993: Ehrendoktorwürde of the University of Graz
1994: Member of the Academia dei Giusprivatisti Europei, Pavia
1994: Doctor honoris causa of the University of Athens
1995: Member of the der Austrian Academy of Sciences, Vienna (philosophical-historical class)
 1997: Honorary Fellow of the Japan Society for the Promotion of Science
 1998: research fellowship of the Society for Advanced Legal Studies, London
1999 to 2006: Secretary of the philosophical-historical class of the Bavarian Academy of Sciences and Vice-President in 1999, 2001, 2003 and 2005
2000: Verdienstkreuz 1. Klasse des Verdienstordens der Bundesrepublik Deutschland
2003: Member of the Istituto Veneto di Scienze, Lettere ed Arti, Venezia
2005: Doctor honoris causa of the University of Verona
2006: Bayerischer Maximiliansorden für Wissenschaft und Kunst
2008: Member of the Istituto Lombardo Accademia di Scienze e Lettere, Milano
2009: Member of the Center for Advanced Studies of the Ludwig-Maximilians-Universität München
2012: Doctor honoris causa of the Pontifícia Universidade Católica do Rio Grande do Sul (PUCRS).

Works
Die Feststellung von Lücken im Gesetz, Berlin 1964, 2nd edition 1983
Systemdenken und Systembegriff in der Jurisprudenz, entwickelt am Beispiel des deutschen Privatrechts, Berlin 1969, 2nd edition 1983
 Spanish: El sistema en la jurisprudencia (1998)
 Italian: Pensiero sistematico e concetto di sistema nella giurisprudenza sviluppati sul modello del diritto privato tedesco (2009)
 Portuguese: Pensamento sistemático e conceito de sistema na ciência do direito (2008)
Die Vertrauenshaftung im deutschen Privatrecht, München 1971 
Bankvertragsrecht, Berlin und New York, 1975, 2nd edition 1981, 3rd edition 1988 volume 1
Schweigen im Rechtsverkehr als Verpflichtungsgrund. in: Festschrift für Willburg zu 70. Geburtstag, Graz 1975, S. 77ff
Recht der Wertpapiere, 12th edition, München, 1986
Handelsrecht, 24th edition, München 2006
Lehrbuch des Schuldrechts volume II/2, 13th edition, München 1994
Die Bedeutung der iustitia distributiva im deutschen Vertragsrecht, Sitzungsberichte der Bayerischen Akademie der Wissenschaften, Jahrgang 1997 Heft 7, München 1997
Grundrechte und Privatrecht, Berlin New York, 1999 
Schuldrechtsmodernisierung 2002, München 2002.
Methodenlehre der Rechtswissenschaft, 3rd edition, 1995

Bibliography
Reinhard Singer: Claus-Canaris (Deutschsprachige Zivilrechtslehrer des 20. Jahrhunderts in Berichten ihrer Schüler, Vol. 2, de Gruyter 2010, p. 365.

References

Jurists from Bavaria
Living people
1937 births
German legal scholars
Officers Crosses of the Order of Merit of the Federal Republic of Germany
People from Legnica